Koyaanisqatsi, also known as Koyaanisqatsi: Life Out of Balance, is a 1982 American experimental non-narrative film directed and produced by Godfrey Reggio with music composed by Philip Glass and cinematography by Ron Fricke.

The film consists primarily of slow motion and time-lapse footage of cities and many natural landscapes across the United States. The visual tone poem contains neither dialogue nor a vocalized narration: its tone is set by the juxtaposition of images and music. Reggio explained the lack of dialogue by stating "it's not for lack of love of the language that these films have no words. It's because, from my point of view, our language is in a state of vast humiliation. It no longer describes the world in which we live." In the Hopi language, the word  means "life out of balance".

The film is the first in the Qatsi film trilogy: it is succeeded by Powaqqatsi (1988) and Naqoyqatsi (2002). The trilogy depicts different aspects of the relationship between humans, nature and technology. Koyaanisqatsi is the best known of the trilogy and is considered a cult film. However, because of copyright issues, the film was out of print for most of the 1990s. In 2000, the film was selected for preservation in the United States National Film Registry by the Library of Congress for being "culturally, aesthetically, or historically significant".

Synopsis
The film begins with the Great Gallery pictograph in Horseshoe Canyon, Canyonlands National Park, depicting several tall figures standing near a taller, crowned one. The next scene depicts the Saturn V rocket during its Apollo 11 launch. It then fades to a desolate desert landscape, before progressing to various natural phenomena.

The film then incorporates humanity in the environment, with shots of choppy water, cultivated flowers, the artificial Lake Powell, a large mining truck causing billows of dust, power lines, mining operations, oil fields, the Navajo Generating Station, the Glen Canyon Dam, and atomic bomb detonations in a desert. A shot sees sunbathers on a beach, with the San Onofre Nuclear Generating Station in the background, before moving on to an aircraft, cars, and military vehicles. Time-lapses of cloud shadows move across skyscrapers, and various housing projects are in disrepair. Destruction of large buildings is depicted, including the demolition of the Pruitt-Igoe housing project in St. Louis. A time-lapse of a crowd queueing is followed by shots of people walking along streets in slow motion.

The next sequence features a sunset reflected in the glass of a skyscraper, before depicting people interacting with modern technology. It sees visceral depictions of traffic, followed by people hurrying to work, and the operation of machines packaging food. Many labors are aided with the use of technology. The sequence begins to come full circle as the manufacture of cars in an assembly-line factory is shown. Daylight highway traffic are shown, followed by the movement of cars, shopping carts, televisions in an assembly line, and elevators. Time-lapses of various television shows being channel surfed are shown. In slow motion, several people react to being candidly filmed; the camera stays on them until the moment they look directly at it. Cars then move speedier.

Shots of microchips and satellite photography of cities are shown, comparing the lay of each of them. Night shots of buildings are shown, as well as of people from all walks of life, from beggars to debutantes. A rocket is seen lifting off to sudden explosion; the camera follows the flaming engine and a white smoky trail as the debris falls. The film concludes with another image of the Great Gallery pictograph, this time with smaller figures. It ends with the definition of the titular Hopi noun ("crazy life; life in turmoil; life out of balance; life disintegrating; a state of life that calls for another way of living") as well as the translation lyrics that was sung in "Prophecies", one of the musical tracks in the film.

Production

Background
In 1972, Godfrey Reggio, of the Institute for Regional Education (IRE), was working on a media campaign in Albuquerque, New Mexico, which was sponsored by the American Civil Liberties Union (ACLU). The campaign involved invasions of privacy and the use of technology to control behavior. Instead of making public service announcements, which Reggio felt "had no visibility", advertising spots were purchased for television, radio, newspapers, and billboards. Over thirty billboards were used for the campaign, and one design featured a close-up of the human eye, which Reggio described as a "horrifying image", To produce the television commercials the IRE hired cinematographer Ron Fricke, who worked on the project for two years. The television advertisements aired during prime-time programming and became so popular that viewers would call the television stations to learn when the next advertisement would be aired. Godfrey described the two-year campaign as "extraordinarily successful", and as a result, Ritalin (methylphenidate) was eliminated as a behavior-modifying drug in many New Mexico school districts. But after the campaign ended, the ACLU eventually withdrew its sponsorship, and the IRE unsuccessfully attempted to raise millions of dollars at a fundraiser in Washington, D.C. The institute only had $40,000 left in its budget, and Reggio was unsure how to use the small amount of funds. Fricke insisted to Reggio that the money could be used to produce a film, which led to the production of Koyaanisqatsi.

Filming

Reggio and Fricke chose to shoot unscripted footage and edit it into an hour-long film. Production began in 1975 in St. Louis, Missouri. 16 mm film was used due to budget constraints, despite the preference to shoot with 35 mm film. Footage of the Pruitt–Igoe housing project was shot from a helicopter, and Fricke nearly passed out during filming, having never flown in a helicopter before. Reggio later chose to shoot in Los Angeles and New York City. As there was no formal script, Fricke shot whatever he felt would "look good on film". While filming in New York City, Fricke developed an idea to shoot portraits of people. A grey paper backdrop was displayed in Times Square, and Fricke stood  back with the camera. People walking by started posing for the camera, thinking it was a still camera, and several shots from the setup ended up in the film. Reggio was not on location in Times Square when Fricke shot the footage and thought the idea of shooting portraits of people was "foolish". Upon viewing the footage, Reggio decided to devote an entire section of the film to portraits. The footage was processed with a special chemical to enhance the film's shadows and details, as all footage was shot only with existing lighting. The IRE's $40,000 was exhausted after the filming, and almost two cases of film had been used. The unedited footage was screened in Santa Fe, New Mexico, but Fricke said it was "boring as hell" and there were "not that many good shots". Fricke later moved to Los Angeles, and took a job as a waiter, unable to get a job in the film industry. While Fricke was working in Los Angeles, he edited the footage into a 20-minute reel, but "without regard for message or political content".

The IRE was continuously receiving funding and wanted to continue the project in 1976, using 35 mm film. After quitting his waiting job, Fricke traveled with a camera crew to the Four Corners, which was chosen for filming for its "alien look". Due to the limited budget, Fricke shot with a 16 mm zoom lens onto 35 mm film. To compensate for the lens size, a 2× extender was added, which turned it into a full 35 mm zoom lens, allowing footage to be clearly captured onto 35 mm film. The two-week shoot included aerial footage taken from an airplane using a hand-held camera and ground footage taken using a tripod. The first aerial footage was too "shaky", so additional footage was taken from a camera mounted onto the airplane. Fricke traveled back to New York City in 1977, during which the New York City blackout occurred. Footage of the blackout was filmed in Harlem and the South Bronx, and the film was desaturated to match the appearance of the 16 mm footage.

Reggio and Fricke came across time-lapse footage in "some low-visibility commercial work". They felt such footage was "the language [they] were missing", and collectively decided to implement time-lapse as a major part of the film to create "an experience of acceleration". For the time-lapse footage, Fricke purchased a Mitchell camera, and built a motor with an intervalometer, which was used to precisely move the camera between frames. The system was powered by a gel cell battery that lasted for twelve hours, which enabled Fricke to shoot without the use of a generator. Most time-lapse shots were filmed at a frame rate of 1½ frames per second. Fricke wanted the footage to "look normal" and not contain any "gimmicky" special effects. The time-lapse shot overlooking the freeway in Los Angeles was filmed from the top of a building through a double exposure, with ten-second delay between frames. The first take was shot throughout the day for twelve hours, then the film was rewound and the same scene was shot at night for twenty minutes.
The scene with the Boeing 747 on the runway was filmed at Los Angeles International Airport, and was the longest continuous shot in the film. Fricke and his focus puller, Robert Hill, filmed at the airport every day for two weeks. To keep the shot of the 747 within the frame, the camera was slowly moved by increasing the voltage to the gear motors.

In addition to footage shot by Fricke, some of the footage of people and traffic in New York City was shot by cinematographer Hilary Harris. During post-production, Reggio was introduced to Harris' Organism (1975), which predominately features time-lapse footage of New York City streets. Reggio was impressed with Harris' work and subsequently hired him to work on Koyaanisqatsi. Footage filmed by cinematographer Louis Schwartzberg was added into the cloud sequence, and additional stock footage was provided by MacGillivray Freeman Films.

While Reggio was working on post-production at the Samuel Goldwyn Studio in 1981, he met film director Francis Ford Coppola through an associate from Zoetrope Studios, Coppola's production company. Before shooting The Outsiders (1983) and Rumble Fish (1983), Coppola requested to see Koyaanisqatsi, and Reggio arranged a private screening shortly after its completion. Coppola told Reggio that he was waiting for a film such as Koyaanisqatsi and that it was "important for people to see", so he added his name into the credits and helped present and distribute the film. Coppola also decided to introduce and end the film with footage of pictographs from the Great Gallery at Horseshoe Canyon in Utah after visiting the site and becoming fascinated by the ancient sandstone murals.

Music

The film's score was composed by Philip Glass and was performed by the Philip Glass Ensemble, conducted by Michael Riesman. One piece written for the film, "Façades", was intended to be played over a montage of scenes from New York's Wall Street. It ultimately was not used in the film; Glass released it as part of his album Glassworks in 1982.

The opening for "The Grid" begins with slow sustained notes on brass instruments. The music builds in speed and dynamics throughout the piece's 21 minutes. When the piece is at its fastest, it is characterized by a synthesizer playing the piece's bass line ostinato.

Glass's music for the film is a highly recognizable example of the minimalist school of composition, which is characterized by heavily repeated figures, simple structures, and a tonal (although not in the traditional common practice sense of the word) harmonic language. Glass was one of the first composers to employ minimalism in film scoring, paving the way for many future composers of that style.

An abbreviated version of the film's soundtrack was released in 1983 by Island Records. Despite the fact that the amount of music in the film was nearly as long as the film itself, this 1983 soundtrack release was only 46 minutes long, and only featured some of the film's pieces.

In 1998, Philip Glass re-recorded the film score with Nonesuch Records with a length of 73 minutes. This new recording includes new additional tracks that were cut from the film, as well as extended versions of tracks from the original album. This album was released as Koyaanisqatsi, rather than a soundtrack to the film.

In 2009, a remastered album was released under Philip Glass' own music label, Orange Mountain Music, as Koyaanisqatsi: Complete Original Soundtrack. This recording, with a length over 76 minutes, includes the original sound-effects and additional music that was used in the film.

The music has become so popular that the Philip Glass Ensemble has toured the world, playing the music for Koyaanisqatsi live in front of the movie screen.

Meaning

Reggio stated that the Qatsi films are intended to simply create an experience and that "it is up [to] the viewer to take for himself/herself what it is that [the film] means." He also said that "these films have never been about the effect of technology, of industry on people. It's been that everyone: politics, education, things of the financial structure, the nation state structure, language, the culture, religion, all of that exists within the host of technology. So it's not the effect of, it's that everything exists within [technology]. It's not that we use technology, we live technology. Technology has become as ubiquitous as the air we breathe ..."

According to Hopi Dictionary: Hopìikwa Lavàytutuveni, the Hopi word koyaanisqatsi is defined as "life of moral corruption and turmoil" or "life out of balance". The prefix koyaanis- means "corrupted" or "chaotic", and the word qatsi means "life" or "existence", literally translating koyaanisqatsi as "chaotic life". The film also defines the word as "crazy life", "life out of balance", "life in turmoil", "life disintegrating", and "a state of life that calls for another way of living".

In the score by Philip Glass, the word "koyaanisqatsi" is chanted at the beginning and end of the film in an "otherworldly" dark, sepulchral basso profondo by singer Albert de Ruiter over a solemn, four-bar organ-passacaglia bassline. Three Hopi prophecies sung by a choral ensemble during the latter part of the "Prophecies" movement are translated just prior to the end credits:
 "If we dig precious things from the land, we will invite disaster."
 "Near the day of Purification, there will be cobwebs spun back and forth in the sky."
 "A container of ashes might one day be thrown from the sky, which could burn the land and boil the oceans."

During the end titles, the film gives Jacques Ellul, Ivan Illich, David Monongye, Guy Debord, and Leopold Kohr credit for inspiration. Moreover, amongst the consultants to the director are listed names including Jeffrey Lew, T. A. Price, Belle Carpenter, Cybelle Carpenter, Langdon Winner, and Barbara Pecarich.

Releases

Theatrical distribution
Koyaanisqatsi premiered at the Santa Fe Film Festival on April 28, 1982. It was screened later that year at the Telluride Film Festival in August and at the New York Film Festival in September.

Triumph Films offered to distribute the film, but Reggio turned down the offer as he wanted to work with a smaller company so he could be more involved with the release. He chose Island Alive as the distributor, a company newly formed in 1983 by Chris Blackwell of Island Records, and Koyaanisqatsi was the company's first release. Select theaters distributed a pamphlet that defined the title and the Hopi prophecies sung in the film, as well as a copy of the soundtrack from Island Records. The first theatrical run featured four-track Dolby Stereo sound, while later runs featured monaural sound.

The film's initial limited release began in San Francisco at the Castro Theatre on April 27, 1983. The producers spent $6,500 on marketing the initial release, which grossed $46,000 throughout its one-week run, and was the highest-grossing film in the San Francisco Bay Area that week. It was released in Los Angeles a month later where it grossed $300,000 at two theaters within 15 weeks. Additional releases in select cities throughout the United States continued in September 1983, beginning with a release in New York City on September 15. In mid-October, Koyaanisqatsi was released onto 40 to 50 screens throughout the country. It was a surprise arthouse hit as well as a popular presentation at colleges and universities.

Home media
Koyaanisqatsi was originally released on VHS and laserdisc by Michael Nesmith's Pacific Arts Video.

The rights to Koyaanisqatsi were passed through various multinational entertainment companies, which eventually prevented a home video release. IRE enforced their legal and contractual rights by creating a federal court lawsuit. IRE distributed a privately issued release of the film on DVD. The release was available to those who made a donation of at least $180 to IRE, and was distributed in a sleeve that was signed by Reggio.

Metro-Goldwyn-Mayer (MGM) eventually received the rights to the film, and Koyaanisqatsi was released on DVD by MGM Home Entertainment on September 18, 2002, coinciding with the release of Naqoyqatsi (2002). Both films were available in a two-disc box set. Each DVD includes a documentary with interviews by Reggio and Glass and trailers for the Qatsi trilogy. Unlike the IRE release, which featured the film in the open matte format in which it was filmed, the MGM release was cropped into a widescreen aspect as it originally was presented in theaters.

On January 13, 2012, a Blu-ray version (screen ratio 16:9) was released in Germany. The Blu-ray was also released in Australia by Umbrella Entertainment on March 22, 2012. In December 2012, Criterion released a remastered DVD and Blu-ray of Koyaanisqatsi, as part of a box set containing the Qatsi Trilogy. The release features 5.1 surround sound audio and a restored digital transfer of the film in 1.85:1 aspect ratio, approved by director Godfrey Reggio.

Reception
On Rotten Tomatoes, Koyaanisqatsi has an approval rating of 90% based on 20 reviews, with an average rating of 8.01/10. The website's critical consensus reads "Koyaanisqatsi combines striking visuals and a brilliant score to produce a viewing experience that manages to be formally daring as well as purely entertaining." In 1983, the film was entered into the 33rd Berlin International Film Festival. Czech pedagogue Rudolf Adler, in his textbook for film educators, describes Koyaanisqatsi as "formulated with absolute precision and congenial expression." It has also been described as a postmodernist film.

Koyaanisqatsi is followed by the sequels Powaqqatsi and Naqoyqatsi and the shorts Anima Mundi and Evidence. Naqoyqatsi was completed after a lengthy delay caused by funding problems and premiered in the United States on October 18, 2002. The film's cinematographer Ron Fricke went on to direct Baraka, a pure cinema movie that is often compared to Koyaanisqatsi.

Legacy
A clip of this film was featured in the 2016 film 20th Century Women.
 The trailer for Grand Theft Auto IV resembles the style of the film, featuring different shots of the fictional Liberty City, with the track "Pruit Igoe" in the background. This track also appears in the final cutscene of the missions "Out of Commission" and "A Revenger's Tragedy" alongside the in-game radio station The Journey.
 The 2009 film Watchmen accompanies the origin story of its character Doctor Manhattan with a montage of the pieces "Prophecies" and "Pruit Igoe", and features the same tracks in its trailer.
 The film inspired the album Music to Films by Dr. Atmo and Oliver Lieb, released on the record label FAX +49-69/450464. The music is completely synchronized to the film.
 The noise rock band Cows covered a version of the title track, "Koyaanisqatsi" on their 1987 debut album, Taint Pluribus Taint Unum.
 The chanted "koyaanisqatsi" lyric from the film's title song was parodied in P. D. Q. Bach's "Prelude to Einstein on the Fritz" (itself a pun on the title of the opera Einstein on the Beach composed by Philip Glass), replaced with the lyric "coy hotsy-totsy".
 This film also inspired RaMell Ross's 2018 Oscar-nominated documentary Hale County This Morning, This Evening.
 A 2010 episode of The Simpsons, "Stealing First Base", features a parody Itchy & Scratchy film titled Koyaanis-Scratchy: Death Out of Balance.
 Two Scrubs episodes feature the main title music with intense staring (the janitor giving JD the 'evil eye'): Season 5, episode 5 My New God and episode 17 My Chopped Liver.
 The music video for Madonna's song "Ray of Light" was heavily inspired by the "Grid" sequence from the movie.
 A 2005 episode of Gilmore Girls features the title music during a scene featuring a character performing an interpretive dance.
 The fourth season of the Netflix original series Stranger Things features the track "Prophecies" in its seventh episode.
 Koyaanisqatsi was performed live at the Hollywood Bowl in Los Angeles, on July 23 2009.
 Koyaanisqatsi was again performed live, in Montreal at the Place des Arts, on September 14 2019.

See also
 Chronos (1985)
 Baraka (1992)
 Samsara (2011)

References

Sources

External links
 
 

 
The Qatsi Trilogy: Counterpoint and Harmony an essay by John Rockwell at the Criterion Collection
Koyaanisqatsi on MUBI
Koyaanisqatsi essay by Daniel Eagan in America's Film Legacy: The Authoritative Guide to the Landmark Movies in the National Film Registry, Bloomsbury Academic, 2010 , pages 778-780 

1982 films
1980s avant-garde and experimental films
1982 documentary films
American avant-garde and experimental films
American documentary films
Documentary films about environmental issues
Documentary films about technology
Existentialist films
Films scored by Philip Glass
Films directed by Godfrey Reggio
Films without speech
United States National Film Registry films
Non-narrative films
Films shot in Utah
Films shot in New York City
Films shot in Chicago
Films shot in Missouri
Films shot in St. Louis
1980s American films
Postmodern films